HDE Controller X is a web-based system configuration tool for Linux. It allows server administrators to set up new websites, e-mail accounts, DNS entries, through a web-based interface.

Antivirus protection
F-Secure is installed through HDE Controller for an antivirus scanner. It stops viruses and other malicious code before they spread to end-users’desktops and corporate servers. The product scans SMTP traffic for viruses, worms and trojans, and also blocks and filters out specified file types.

IPv6 and IPv4 Support
HDE Controller X supports IPv4 and IPv6 dual-stack access environments.

External links
Official HDE Controller X website

Unix configuration utilities